Szamuely is the surname of a Hungarian Jewish family.
Among its members are
 Tibor Szamuely (1890-1919), a Bolshevik revolutionary
 Tibor Szamuely (historian) (1925-1972), his nephew
 George Szamuely, the younger Tibor Szamuely's son and noted anti-Communist columnist